Events in the year 2022 in Iran, which is dominated by protests.

The situation in Iran remains complex and challenging, as the country has long defied international norms and supported militants abroad. In 2018, the Trump administration withdrew from the 2015 nuclear agreement with Iran and imposed sanctions as part of a "maximum pressure" campaign. In 2020, Iran recalculated its strategy after the US killed a top Iranian commander. In 2021, the Biden administration attempted to revive the nuclear deal, but talks were deadlocked as of fall 2022. Protests over human rights abuses and the death of a detained Kurd in September 2022 evolved into calls for the end of the Islamic Republic. The US Institute of Peace works to inform policymakers on Iran and provide a forum for virtual diplomacy. It offers expert analysis, briefings for lawmakers, and resources for the public.

Incumbents 
 Supreme Leader of Iran: Ali Khamenei
 President of Iran: Ebrahim Raisi
 Speaker of the Parliament: Mohammad Bagher Ghalibaf
 Chief Justice: Gholam-Hossein Mohseni-Eje'i

Events 
Ongoing - 2021–2022 Iranian protests (2022 Iranian food protests and Mahsa Amini protests); Sistan and Baluchestan insurgency
16 March - Anoosheh Ashoori and Nazanin Zaghari-Ratcliffe released from prison
5 April - Imam Reza shrine stabbings
23 May - Abadan building collapse
8 June - 2022 South Khorasan train derailment
2 July - 2022 Hormozgan earthquakes
16 September - Guidance Patrol officers beat 22-year old Mahsa Amini to death in Tehran for not wearing her hijab properly, sparking major protests across the country.
30 September - 2022 Zahedan massacre
5 October - 2022 West Azerbaijan earthquake
15 October - Evin Prison fire
26 October - Shah Cheragh massacre

Deaths 
16 September – Mahsa Amini, 22, victim of police brutality (b. 2000)
20 September – Minoo Majidi, 62, shot to death during the Mahsa Amini protests (b. 1960)
20 September – Nika Shakarami, 16, abducted (on that date) and later reported dead during the Mahsa Amini protests (b. 2005)
21 September – Hadis Najafi, 22, shot to death during the Mahsa Amini protests (b. 2000)
23 September – Sarina Esmailzadeh, 16, beaten to death during the Mahsa Amini protests (b. 2006)
12 October – Asra Panahi, 15, beaten to death during the Mahsa Amini protests (b. 2007)
23 October – Amou Haji, 94, man who did not wash for over 60 years (b. 1928)

References 
 "سپاه از کشته شدن غلام شه‌بخش و پنج عضو گروهش و همچنین سه بسیجی در منطقه کورین خبر داد". ایران اینترنشنال (in Persian). Retrieved 2022-02-05.
 "Protests in Iran at death of Kurdish woman after arrest by morality police". the Guardian. 2022-09-17. Retrieved 2022-09-17.
 Hallam, Adam Pourahmadi,Jonny (2022-09-16). "Woman, 22, dies after falling into coma while in custody of Iran's morality police". CNN. Retrieved 2022-09-17.
 "The Current Situation in Iran A USIP Fact Sheet" Retrieved 2022-12-12

 
Iran
Iran
2020s in Iran
Years of the 21st century in Iran